Paul Mbiybe Verdzekov (January 22, 1931 – January 26, 2010) was a Cameroonian prelate of the Roman Catholic Church. He served as bishop of Bamenda, Cameroon from 1970 till 1982 and as archbishop from 1982 till 2006.

Life
Born in Shisong on January 22, 1931, Paul Mbiybe Verdzekov was ordained to the priesthood on December 20, 1961.

On August 13, 1970, he was appointed bishop of the newly created diocese of Bamenda. Verdzekov received his episcopal consecration on the following November 8 from Julius Joseph Willem Peeters, bishop of Buéa, with the then bishop of Garoua, Yves-Joseph-Marie Plumey, and the bishop of Sangmélima, Pierre-Célestin Nkou, serving as co-consecrators.

On March 18, 1982 he became archbishop of Bamenda when his diocese was elevated to archdiocese by Pope John Paul II. Archbishop Verdzekov retired on January 23, 2006. He died in 2010, aged 79, as Archbishop Emeritus of Bamenda.

References

External links

1931 births
2010 deaths
20th-century Roman Catholic archbishops in Africa
21st-century Roman Catholic archbishops in Africa
Cameroonian Roman Catholic archbishops
People from Bamenda
Roman Catholic archbishops of Bamenda
Roman Catholic bishops of Bamenda